Baradine County is one of the 141 Cadastral divisions of New South Wales. It is bounded in the north by the Namoi River, and includes the land south to Coonabarabran, which is on its southern edge. This includes land on both sides of the Baradine Creek and the town of Baradine.

Baradine is believed to be derived from a local Aboriginal word.

Parishes within the county
A full list of parishes found within this county; their current LGA and mapping coordinates to the approximate centre of each location is as follows:

References

Counties of New South Wales